The Goascorán River or Río Goascorán is a river in Central America. It rises in the La Sierra mountain ridge in Honduras and flows southward along the El Salvador-Honduras border for about 75 miles (120 km). It courses past Goascorán city to La Unión Bay, an inlet of the Gulf of Fonseca.

References
 Inversiones estratégicas en la cuenca binacional del río Goascorán 
 Information Sheet on Ramsar Wetlands
 Goascoran River information from Encyclopedia Britannica

Rivers of Honduras
Rivers of El Salvador
El Salvador–Honduras border
International rivers of North America
Border rivers